The Desert Fox is a 1951 American biographical war film from 20th Century Fox about the role of German  Field Marshal Erwin Rommel in World War II. It stars James Mason in the title role, was directed by Henry Hathaway, and was based on the book Rommel: The Desert Fox by Brigadier Desmond Young, who served in the British Indian Army in North Africa.

The movie played a significant role in the creation of the Rommel myth: that Rommel was an apolitical, brilliant commander, opposed Nazi policies and was a victim of the Third Reich because of his participation in the conspiracy to remove Adolf Hitler from power in 1944.

The black and white format facilitates the spreading of large sections of actual documentary footage of war action etc. throughout the film. Finnish president and Field Marshal Carl Gustaf Emil Mannerheim's personal Mercedes-Benz 770, a gift received from Adolf Hitler, was used as a prop car in the during the film's shooting and appears.

Plot
In November 1941 a British commando unit deploys from a submarine off the North African coast. Its mission is to raid the headquarters of German Field Marshal Erwin Rommel and assassinate the “Desert Fox”. There are heavy casualties on both sides, but Rommel is not among them. He is recovering from nasal diphtheria in a hospital in Germany.

A phone call from Adolf Hitler promptly returns him to his Afrika Corps command, with the British Eighth Army under General Bernard Montgomery poised to counterattack the Axis forces in the  second Battle of El Alamein. Without adequate supplies, weapons, fuel, or men, Rommel is ordered by Hitler to hold fast and fight to the last man. He questions the outrageous directive, initially attributing it to the “clowns“ surrounding Hitler in Berlin, and demands it be re-transmitted again. Receiving the same message, he crumples it with the intention of disregarding the command.

Rommel again falls ill and is returned to Germany, where he is hospitalized. An old family friend, Dr. Karl Strölin, Lord Mayor of Stuttgart, visits him to request he join a group of dissidents plotting to overthrow Hitler. Rommel strongly resists.

After his recuperation, Rommel is transferred to Western Europe, where he is placed in charge of completing the Atlantic Wall. After inspection, he realizes its defenses are in adequate to protect against an Allied invasion. He and his superior, Field Marshal Gerd von Rundstedt, are handicapped by Hitler's astrology-based belief that the real invasion will come at Calais. As a result, the June 6, 1944 Allied “D-Day” landing at Normandy is successful, and a broad beachhead is secured. Hitler then compounds his error by refusing to release troops and tanks desperately needed to halt the Allies, and again forbids an orderly retreat to set up a strong defense.

Rommel then risks broaching the topic of a conspiracy against Hitler with von Rundstedt. The older man refuses to commit, but wishes Rommel success with the plot, indicating he expects Rommel to be named his successor within 24 hours.

Immediately after, Rommel is seriously injured when his staff car is strafed by an Allied plane; once again he spends an extended recuperation at home.

On July 20 Colonel Claus von Stauffenberg plants a bomb at Hitler's feet during a meeting of the general staff at the Wolf's Lair. It detonates with severe casualties, but Hitler survives. Thousands suspected of complicity in the attack are tracked down and executed.

An official silence surrounds Rommel, but evidence of his secret participation is gathered. Soon after, General Wilhelm Burgdorf is sent by Hitler to charge Rommel with treason, instructed to offer the beloved national hero a choice between sure conviction, destruction of his reputation, and death by garrote, or an immediate but painless suicide (with his passing attributed to cumulative war wounds), along with the promise that his wife and son will be well looked after. The veiled threat to their welfare should Rommel insist on a public trial, cinches his decision.

He bids a stoic farewell to his wife, who promises to explain the choice to their son, Rommel, then climbs into a staff car to meet his fate en route to Berlin.

A voiceover of an actor reciting a speech British Prime Minister Winston Churchill delivered to the House of Commons in praise of Rommel for his chivalry in battle, tactical genius, and courageous stance against Hitler leads to the credits.

Cast

 James Mason as Field Marshal Erwin Johannes Rommel
 Cedric Hardwicke as Dr. Karl Strölin
 Jessica Tandy as Frau Lucie Rommel
 Luther Adler as Adolf Hitler
 Everett Sloane as General Wilhelm Burgdorf
 Leo G. Carroll as Field Marshal Gerd von Rundstedt
 George Macready as General Fritz Bayerlein
 Richard Boone as Captain Hermann Aldinger
 Eduard Franz as Colonel Claus von Stauffenberg
 Desmond Young as Lieutenant Colonel Desmond Young
 Michael Rennie Narrator  
 Paul Cavanagh as Lt. Col. Caesar von Hofacker (uncredited)
 John Hoyt as Field Marshal Wilhelm Keitel
 Walter Kingsford as Vice Admiral Friedrich Ruge
 John Goldsworthy as General Carl-Heinrich von Stülpnagel

Production
The film was based on a book by 
British army officer and North African Campaign veteran Desmond Young (a Lt. colonel whose life was effectively personally spared by Rommel's insistence on military law being scrupulously adhered to, depicted early in the film) that sold some 175,000 copies in Britain.

In February 1950, even before the book was published, it was announced Nunnally Johnson of Fox was leading the negotiations to obtain the film rights to the book. Johnson would write and produce and Kirk Douglas was the first star mentioned.

Johnson eventually made the film as the first part of his new five-year contract with Fox. He normally took ten weeks to write a script but said this one took him eight months because it was so complex, and involved many people who were still alive. While writing it he says the British were generally positive (Rommel had a very high reputation in Britain) but there was some controversy in the US about a Hollywood studio making a sympathetic biography about a German general.

Johnson later said, "If Rommel hadn't been involved in the plot against Hitler, this screenplay wouldn't have been written. Circumstances allowed Rommel to be a pretty good fellow because there were no civilians involved in the North Africa campaigns. I have tried to write the script with detachment. There is no effort to solicit sympathy for him, except in the final sequence. There are the circumstances as he says goodbye to his wife and son to go to his death [which] would undoubtedly create sympathy for any man. Rommel was a very limited man intellectually. His problem was a conflict of loyalties. He followed a false god and when he found that out he risked being a traitor."

In January 1951 Henry Hathaway, who had signed to direct, left to shoot second unit footage in Germany and North Africa. Richard Widmark was being talked about as a possible Rommel.

In February 1951, James Mason signed to play Rommel. Mason's career had been on a downward slide since he moved to the US from Britain and he had lobbied Darryl F Zanuck to play the role and was so keen to do it he agreed to sign a long-term contract with Fox, to make one film a year for seven years.

The movie was one of the first to use a

Reception
The film was very popular in Britain, despite scattered protests.

Role in Rommel myth

The movie played a significant role in the Rommel myth, a view that the Field Marshal was an apolitical, brilliant commander. From 1941, it was picked up and disseminated in the West by the British press, as it sought to explain its continued inability to defeat the Axis forces in North Africa.

After the war, the Western Allies, and particularly the British, depicted Rommel as the "good German" and "our friend Rommel". His reputation for conducting a clean war was used for the West German rearmament as well as reconciliation between the former enemies – Britain and the United States on one side and the new Federal Republic on the other.

They portrayed Rommel sympathetically, as a loyal, humane soldier and a firm opponent of Hitler's policies. The movie plays up Rommel's  role in the conspiracy against Hitler but  leaves Rommel's early association with the dictator largely implied. Critical and public reception in the US was muted, but the movie was a success in Britain, along with a less-known 1953 movie, The Desert Rats, in which Mason resumed his portrayal of Rommel.

The movie proved one of the suitable tools for the reconciliation among the former enemies. British popular knowledge at that time focused on the reconstruction of the fighting in that theatre of war, almost to the exclusion of all others. The Desert Fox helped in creating an image of the German army that would be acceptable to the British public.

The film received nearly-universally positive reviews in Britain, but protests at the movie theatres broke out in Vienna and Milan. Basil Liddell Hart, who later edited Rommel's wartime writings into the 1953 book The Rommel Papers, watched the movie with other high-ranking British officers, and reported being

References

Citations

Bibliography

External links

 
 
 
 

1951 films
1951 war films
1950s biographical films
American war films
American biographical films
American black-and-white films
Biographical films about military leaders
Films based on biographies
North African campaign films
Western Front of World War II films
Operation Overlord films
Films about the 20 July plot
Films set in 1941
Films set in 1942
Films set in 1943
Films set in 1944
Films set in Germany
Cultural depictions of Erwin Rommel
Cultural depictions of Adolf Hitler
20th Century Fox films
Films directed by Henry Hathaway
Films with screenplays by Nunnally Johnson
Films scored by Daniele Amfitheatrof
American World War II films
1950s English-language films
1950s American films